Sunil Kumar may refer to:
 Sunil Kumar (academic administrator), Indian American college administrator
 Sunil Kumar Kushwaha, Indian politician, Lok Sabha member from Bihar
 Sunil Kumar (born 1957), Indian politician, member of the Bihar Legislative Assembly from Biharsharif
Sunil Kumar (born 1988), Indian politician, member of the Bihar Legislative Assembly from Bhore Vidhansabha